Vaishya Vani is a sub-caste of Vaishyas, one of the varnas of Hinduism. Because of their hereditary occupation as traders and merchants, they are found in many regions in India, including Konkan, Bihar, some parts of the Canara subregion of Karnataka & the Cochin area in Kerala. In the Konkan division of Maharashtra, there were subdivisions of Vani communities, like Kudali (coming from Kudal) in Savantwadi, Sangameshwari (from Sangameshwar) in Ratnagiri& Patne (from Patan) in Satara. In the Goa state, they speak Konkani and Mahratti. In the Gujarat state and the Daman territory, they are also known as Vaishnav or Vaishnav Vanik.

During the period of the Kadambas of Goa, they were known as Banajigas (merchants) who were engaged in trade. The reference to these Banajigas from Savoi Verem, Narve, Khandepar, Kapilagram, Bandivade and Taligram are mentioned in Khandepar copper plate of 1358 CE.

OBC status was given to Vaishya Vanis in 2008, which was later removed in 2011.now in OBC  At present Vaishya Vanis fall under OBC while others are classed as general category.

See also
Vanika
Chettiar

References

Konkani
Indian castes
Bania communities
Social groups of Karnataka
Social groups of Maharashtra
Social groups of Goa